Hayley Jane Lewis, OAM (born 2 March 1974), is an Australian former competitive swimmer best known for winning five gold medals and one bronze medal at the 1990 Commonwealth Games as a 15-year-old.

Lewis is a former host of The Biggest Loser.

Sporting career
Lewis's 1990 Commonwealth Games gold medals were in the 200-metre freestyle, the 400-metre freestyle, the 200-metre butterfly, 400-metre individual medley and the 4×200-metre freestyle relay. She also won a bronze in the 200-metre individual medley.

At the 1991 World Championships in Perth she won gold in the 200-metre freestyle, silver in the 400-metre freestyle, silver in the 400-metre individual medley, and bronze in the 200-metre butterfly.

For the rest of her career, Lewis focused on the 800-metre freestyle, in which her best Olympic result was a silver medal at the 1992 Summer Olympics and a silver at the 1994 Rome World Championships. She also won a bronze medal in the 400-metre freestyle in Barcelona. At the 2001 World Aquatics Championships, Lewis won a bronze medal in the 5-kilometre open water competition. She had planned to attempt to qualify for the 10-kilometre open water event at the 2004 Summer Olympics, but this event was removed from the competition.  She competed at three Olympics.

Post swimming career

Lewis is a previous host of the Australian version of The Biggest Loser between 2010 and 2014. She started the first swimming centre based inside a major shopping centre within Australia in 2002 at Westfield Carindale in Brisbane.

In September 2010, Westfield's redevelopment plans saw Lewis's pool demolished. She now owns a gift and homewares store in Brisbane, Coming Up Roses.

In April 2011, Random House published Hayley's first business book, Dream Believe Create.
She married her childhood sweetheart, Greg Taylor, in 1997 and they have two sons, Jacob and Kai. 

She is also a regular contributor to entertainment and lifestyle website Live4.

Honours

Lewis was inducted into the Sport Australia Hall of Fame in 1997. She received an Australian Sports Medal in 2000 and a Medal of the Order of Australia in 2003.

See also
 List of Olympic medalists in swimming (women)
 List of World Aquatics Championships medalists in swimming (women)
 List of Commonwealth Games medallists in swimming (women)

References

External links 
 ABC Online News: Athletes - Hayley Lewis
 Australian Swimming | News Article
 Australian Associated Press, Hayley Lewis called to murder trial, The Sydney Morning Herald, 21 October 2003
 ABC Online News - Athletes - Hayley Lewis
 

1974 births
Living people
Olympic swimmers of Australia
Swimmers at the 1992 Summer Olympics
Swimmers at the 1996 Summer Olympics
Swimmers at the 2000 Summer Olympics
Australian female freestyle swimmers
Australian female butterfly swimmers
Sportswomen from Queensland
Australian Swimmers of the Year
Swimmers at the 1990 Commonwealth Games
Swimmers at the 1994 Commonwealth Games
Commonwealth Games gold medallists for Australia
Commonwealth Games bronze medallists for Australia
Olympic bronze medalists in swimming
Australian female medley swimmers
Female long-distance swimmers
World Aquatics Championships medalists in swimming
World Aquatics Championships medalists in open water swimming
People educated at Brisbane State High School
Recipients of the Medal of the Order of Australia
Recipients of the Australian Sports Medal
Sport Australia Hall of Fame inductees
Swimmers from Brisbane
Medalists at the 1992 Summer Olympics
Commonwealth Games silver medallists for Australia
Olympic bronze medalists for Australia
Commonwealth Games medallists in swimming
Olympic silver medalists for Australia
Medallists at the 1990 Commonwealth Games
Medallists at the 1994 Commonwealth Games